AE Polykastro is a football club based in Polykastro, Greece. It was founded in 1951.

Polykastro has spent 10 seasons in the Gamma Ethniki, last appearing during the 2007–08 season.

References

Football clubs in Central Macedonia
1951 establishments in Greece